Gunah may refer to:

 Guanah, a Persian word referring to sin, specifically Islamic views on sin
 Gunah Bakhan, a village in Quri Chay-ye Gharbi Rural District, Saraju District, Maragheh County
 Gunah Aur Kanoon, a 1970 Bollywood drama film
 Ek Gunah Aur Sahi, an Indian Hindi film released in 1980
 Günah Keçisi, a Turkish 2011 film